Sakti State was one of the princely states of India during the British Raj. It belonged to the Chhattisgarh States Agency, which later became the Eastern States Agency.

The capital was Sakti town, which had 1,791 inhabitants, according to the 1901 Census of India. Today, it is located in the state of Chhattisgarh. It had an area of 357 km2 and,  Its rulers were Gond and had a privy purse of 29,000 rupees. The princely state acceded to the Indian Union on 1 January 1948, thus ceasing to exist.

History
Sakti State's rulers were Raj Gonds. The year when the state was founded is not known. Legend says that it was founded by two twin brothers, who were soldiers of the Raja of Sambalpur. The capital was in Sakti, Janjgir-Champa district, Chhattisgarh.
Sakti's last ruler was Rana Bahadur Leeladhar Singh, born on 3 February 1892, who succeeded as new rana on 4 July 1914. The princely family still exists and is headed by Raja Surender Bahadur Singh, who represented India in its hockey team and was twice a minister for the government of the State of Madhya Pradesh. On the 19 October 2021, Kunwar Dharmendra Singh, adopted son of Raja Surender Bahadur Singh was announced to be the successor as head of Royal family as King. In early January 2022, a F.I.R. was filed against Kunwar Dharmendra Singh for rape, house tre-passing and assault

Rulers
The rulers of this princely state bore the title of 'Rana'.
.... – ....                Rudra Singh 
.... – ....                Udai Singh 
.... – ....                Kiwat Singh 
.... – ....                Kagan Singh 
.... – 1837 Kalandar Singh 
1837–19 Jun 1850 Vacant
19 Jun 1850 – 1875 Ranjit Singh (b. 1836 – d. ....) 
1875 – Feb 1892 Vacant
Feb 1892 – Jul 1914 Rup Narayan Singh
 4 July 1914 – 15 August 1947 Liladhar Singh (b. 1892 – d. 19..)

See also 
 Eastern States Agency
Political integration of India

References

External links
The Indian Princely States website

Princely states of India
Janjgir-Champa district
History of Chhattisgarh